Michael McKenna may refer to:

 Michael McKenna (bishop) (born 1951), Australian Roman Catholic bishop
 Michael McKenna (Australian footballer) (born 1961), Australian footballer for Footscray and Richmond
 Michael McKenna (Scottish footballer) (born 1991), Scottish footballer for Arbroath and Berwick Rangers
 Michael McKenna (priest) (died 1875), Irish-American prelate with ties to Irish nationalism
 Michael McKenna (Scrabble player), 2012 World Youth Scrabble Champion and world record holder
 Michael McKenna (Shortland Street), a fictional character on the New Zealand soap opera Shortland Street
 Mike McKenna (ice hockey) (born 1983), National Hockey League goaltender
 Mike McKenna (musician) (born 1946), Canadian rock / blues guitarist